John Alves Arbuthnot (1802–1875) was a British banker, co-founder of Arbuthnot Latham, a private bank.

In 1833, he co-founded Arbuthnot Latham with Alfred Latham.

References

1802 births
1875 deaths
British bankers
British company founders
John Alves
19th-century British businesspeople